Ned Hanlan is a steam-powered tugboat that operated in Toronto Harbour in Toronto, Ontario, Canada. The tugboat entered service in 1932 and was retired in 1967. She was then put on display at Exhibition Place. She was moved in 2012 to Hanlan's Point on the Toronto Islands; she is named after champion rower Ned Hanlan.

Tugboat
Ned Hanlan was built in 1932. She was designed by naval architect John Stephen for the City of Toronto Works Department. She was constructed in Toronto, in the Portlands district. Ned Hanlan was named after Ned Hanlan, a 19th-century Toronto resident, and world champion rower. She served as a tug for lake steamers, assisted in works project and acted as a backup island ferry between the island airport and the mainland.

Static display
Ned Hanlan was retired in 1967 and remained moored in Toronto Harbour until 1971, when she was moved for a static display next to the Toronto Maritime Museum housed in the old Stanley Barracks' Officers' Quarters at Exhibition Place. In June 2012, the tugboat was moved to a new home on Hanlan's Point on the Toronto Islands.
 
Ned Hanlan is in reasonably good shape, with little rust, and a slight dent in her port gunwale just fore of the wheelhouse. The screw and rudder have been removed.

Specifications

 Owner: Toronto Transportation Commission., 1932, Canada
 Builder: Toronto Dry Dock Co., 1932, Canada, Ontario, Toronto
 Engine Builder: John Inglis, 1932
 Year Built: 1932
 Year Engine Built: 1932
 Final Disposition: Exhibit ship in Toronto.
 Registry Number: C. 157362
 Hull Number: None
 Vessel Type: Tug and Ferry
 Length: 
 Width: .
 Height: 
 Gross Tonnage: 
 Net Tonnage: 
 Materials: Steel
 Engine Type: Fore and Aft
 Piston #1: 
 Piston #2: 
 Stroke Length:

Ned Hanlan II
Another tug in Toronto operates as Ned Hanlan. The tug Ned Hanlan II is a Toronto Works Department tug. This boat was originally owned by Toronto Police Service.

See also
Museum ship
List of museum ships
Ship replica
Ships preserved in museums

References

Tugboats of Canada
Museum ships in Canada
Museum ships in Ontario
History of Toronto
1932 ships
Tugboats on the Great Lakes
Ships built in Ontario